Colossal magnetoresistance (CMR) is a property in many perovskite oxides. However, the requirement of large external magnetic field hinders the potential applications. On one hand, people were looking for the physical mechanisms for the CMR originality. On the other hand, people were trying to find alternative ways to further improve the CMR effect.  Large magnetoresistance at relative low magnetic field had been reported in doped LaMnO3 polycrystal samples, rather than single crystal. The spin polarized tunneling and spin dependent scattering across large angle boundaries are responsible for the Low field magnetoresistance (LFMR).

In order to obtain LFMR in epitaxial thin films (single-crystal like materials), epitaxial strain has been used. Wang and Li reported an enhancement of the magnetoresistance  in 5- to 15-nm-thick Pr0.67Sr0.33MO3 films using out-of-plane tensile strain. In a conventional strain engineering framework, epitaxial strain is only effective below the critical thickness, which is usually less than a few tens of nanometers. Tuning electron transport by epitaxial strain has only been achieved in ultrathin layers because of the relaxation of epitaxial strains in relatively thick films.

Vertically aligned heteroepitaxial nanoscaffolding films have been proposed to generate strain in thick films. A vertical lattice strain as large as 2% has been achieved in La0.7Sr0.3MnO3:MgO vertical nanocomposites. The magnetoresistance, magnetic anisotropy, and magnetization can be tuned by the vertical strain in films over few hundred nanometers thick.

References

Thin films